Hindi perhaps has the second most translations of the Tirukkural among all the languages in India, next only to Malayalam. As of 2000, there were at least 19 translations of the Kural text available in Hindi. Many of these translations are in verse form.

History
The first translation of the Kural text into Hindi was probably made by Khenand Rakat, who published the translated work in 1924. Khan Chand Rahit published a translation in 1926. In 1958, the University of Madras published a translation by Sankar Raju Naidu under the title "Tamil Ved." In 1964, another translation was published by M. G. Venkatakrishnan, whose second edition appeared in 1998. In 1967, another translation was published under the title "Uttar Ved." In 1982, a translation of 700 couplets of the Kural text was published under the title "Satsai." There was yet another Hindi translation in 1989. In 1990, T. E. S. Raghavan rendered a poetic rendition in couplet form in 'Venba' metre as in the source, following four words in the first line and three in the second. In 2000, a translation by Ananda Sandhidut was published under the title Kural Kavitā Valī.

Translations

See also
 Tirukkural translations
 List of Tirukkural translations by language

References

Further reading
 Venkatakrishnan, M. G. (1998). Thirukkural. Chennai: Sakthi Finance Ltd.

Hindi
Translations into Hindi